Vallecito Wash is a wash part of Vallecito Creek, a tributary stream of Carrizo Creek, in San Diego County, California.

The Vallecito Wash trail is suitable for scenic driving year round.

References     

Rivers of San Diego County, California
Rivers of Southern California